Read My Lips is the debut studio album by English singer Sophie Ellis-Bextor. It was released on 27 August 2001 by Polydor Records. After the disbandment of the Britpop group Theaudience, in which Ellis-Bextor served as vocalist, she was signed to Polydor. Prior to the LP's completion, the singer collaborated with several musicians, including band Blur's bassist Alex James, Moby and New Radicals frontman Gregg Alexander. The record was described as a collection of 1980s electronica and 1970s disco music.

Critical response to Read My Lips was polarised, with music critics denouncing its content that was, according to one magazine, Q, of lesser quality than "Groovejet (If This Ain't Love)"—the singer's collaboration with Italian DJ Spiller and according to others, inherently malign simply on account of being chart pop. The album reached number two on the UK Albums Chart, and has since been certified double platinum by the British Phonographic Industry (BPI). It spawned four singles: "Take Me Home", "Murder on the Dancefloor", double A-side single "Get Over You"/"Move This Mountain" and "Music Gets the Best of Me".

Background

Following the disbandment of Britpop group Theaudience, Ellis-Bextor provided vocals for the song "Groovejet (If This Ain't Love)" by Italian DJ Spiller. The song was a commercial success, and Ellis-Bextor signed to Polydor. She was contacted by director Baz Luhrmann, who offered her a role in the 2001 film Moulin Rouge!, but the singer refused in order to focus on her career as a recording artist. The success of "Groovejet" also prompted American musician Moby to notice Ellis-Bextor, and revealed interest in working with her due to her "amazing" voice, as he described it. He instructed his record company to "track" Ellis-Bextor "down" so they could start working as soon as Moby finished his tour. The two ultimately wrote five songs in New York City, which did not make the final cut of Read My Lips. Furthermore, she also recorded with Blur bassist Alex James, as well as former frontman of the New Radicals, Gregg Alexander, while Damian LeGassick was recruited for his programming and keyboard work.

The album's title was chosen due to the strong lipstick Ellis-Bextor used for the album artwork, the "Take Me Home" music video and “Read My Lips” is sung in the opening verse of the album track “The Universe Is You”.  The album photography was shot by Mert Alas.

Composition
An "eclectic" album, Read My Lips, is a collection of 1980s electronica and 1970s disco. The album opener and first single is a cover version of Cher's 1979 song "Take Me Home", described as a "disco groove". Betty Clarke from The Guardian observed that her voice in the song is reminiscent of Audrey Hepburn's Eliza Doolittle (in the movie My Fair Lady). "Move This Mountain", co-written by Alex James, is a "vibrant" ballad with a trip hop-influenced sound. Following track and second single, "Murder on the Dancefloor", is a dance-pop and disco record, that utilises bass guitar and piano in its instrumental. "Sparkle" has "speeding beats and equally speeding keyboards", while "Final Move" contains "tinny beats" and "electro swirls". The latter was deemed a "subdued version" of "Murder on the Dancefloor" with "similar kaleidoscope synth". "I Believe" was described as "funky" and "live-sounding", while "Leave the Others Alone" involves "cold beats" and "big, full-throttle keyboards". "By Chance" was particularly noted for showcasing Ellis-Bextor's accent. Re-release new song "Get Over You" is a "polite" Euro disco take on "I Will Survive".

Singles and promotion

Promotion for Read My Lips launched with the release of "Take Me Home", a cover of the song by singer Cher, which was released on 13 August 2001. Although its production and Ellis-Bextor's vocal performance in the song were heavily criticised, the single reached number two on the UK Singles Chart. After the release of the album, "Murder on the Dancefloor" was serviced as its second single on 3 December 2001. It peaked in the top 10 of the charts in Australia, Austria, Belgium, Canada, Denmark, France, Hungary, Ireland, Italy, Netherlands, New Zealand, Norway, Sweden, Switzerland and the UK. A double A-side single including new re-release song "Get Over You" and original album track "Move This Mountain" was released on 10 June 2002, in a set of two CD singles.

Ellis-Bextor, who had previously felt uncomfortable with the idea of touring, confirmed a UK-only tour in January 2002, which took place from April to May. Later, in July 2002, other dates of the tour were revealed for 2003.

Critical reception

Toby Manning from Q cited "Take Me Home" and "Move This Mountain" as the album's highlights, but, overall, he thought that the record failed to live up to the standard set by the previous collaboration with Spiller. He also found that the album's music and the distinctive pronunciation of Ellis-Bextor's vocal delivery did not work to complimentary effect. Betty Clarke from The Guardian described the album as a "sophisticated package" but said "there's little to love and even less fun to be had". Kelvin Hayes from AllMusic dubbed it "a disappointing debut from Ellis-Bextor, fusing Human League synth with beats and cinematic strings", but described "Murder on the Dancefloor" as the "shimmering highlight" from the album. A critic from entertainment.ie said "the material on her debut solo album only rarely does justice to her distinctive upper-crust voice", and said that "most of the songs sound laboured and plod where they should swing".

In contrast to the previous reviews, Andrew Arora from Blue Coupe had a more positive response to the record. Arora said "it lands somewhere between Pet Shop Boys' synth-pop faculty and Blondie's Parallel Lines album", although he claimed that fans of "Groovejet (If This Ain't Love)" "should not expect much from this album, but it does deliver a dynamic electro disco sound that is sometimes analogous to her breakthrough-hit single".

Commercial performance
Read My Lips debuted at number four on the UK Albums Chart with first-week sales of 23,023 copies.  Although the original ten track edition dropped down and out of the charts over the next few weeks, a twelve track UK edition, released December 2001, peaked at number three in January 2002 following the singles chart success of Murder on the Dancefloor. Finally a fifteen-track edition with a considerably revised running order was released in summer 2002 and peaked at number two - 41 weeks after the original edition first charted. On 21 June 2002, it was certified double platinum by the British Phonographic Industry (BPI). The album had sold 833,968 copies as of January 2014.

Track listing

Notes
  signifies an additional producer

Personnel

Sophie Ellis-Bextor – vocals
Matt Rowe – producer
Gregg Alexander – producer
Damian LeGassick – producer, programming, keyboards, guitars
Gary Wilkinson – producer
Ben Hillier – producer, programming, piano, drums
Alex James – producer, bass guitar, guitars
Steve Osborne – producer
Marko Rakascan – producer, recording, programming, engineer, guitars, mixing
Henri Korpi – producer, arranger, keyboards, programming
Blackcell – producer, arranger
R. Hall – producer, recording
Jeremy Wheatley – additional production, mixing, remixing
Yoad Nevo – programming, guitars, percussion, keyboards, drum programming
Guy Pratt – bass guitar
John Themis – guitars
Rosie Wetter – string arrangement

Nick Franglen – programming
Bacon & Quarmby – recording
Jake Davies – mix engineer, additional programming, sound design
Ross Newell – guitars, keyboards, bass
Juliet Roberts – backing vocals
Sylvia Mason-James – backing vocals
Saphena Aziz – backing vocals
Jennifer John – backing vocals
Darren Nash – assistant engineer
Stefan Skarbek – programming
Rik Simpson – engineer
Aidan Love – programming, arrangement
Andrea Wright – assistant engineer
Niklas Flyckt – mixing
Gordon Elmquist – assistant engineer
Nina Woodford – background vocals
Emma Holmgren – background vocals
Mathias Johansson – guitar, bass, keyboards, programming
Ben Thacker – engineer

Charts

Weekly charts

Year-end charts

Certifications

Tour

The Read My Lips Tour was the debut concert tour by Sophie Ellis-Bextor, in support of her debut studio album. Beginning January 2003, the tour visited the European continent. As of 2013, it is the biggest tour Ellis-Bextor has ever headlined.

Background
The Read My Lips tour is the biggest tour Ellis-Bextor has ever gone on, having 38 dates and two legs. The Shepherd's Bush Empire gig was recorded, later being released in Ellis-Bextor's first video album, Watch My Lips.

Setlist
This setlist was obtained from the concert held 3 May 2002 at the Shepherd's Bush Empire in London, England. It does not represent all concerts for the duration of the tour. 
"Sparkle"
"The Universe Is You"
"Lover"
"A Pessimist Is Never Disappointed"
"By Chance"
"Final Move"
"Is It Any Wonder"
"Groovejet (If This Ain't Love)"
"Everything Falls into Place"
"Murder on the Dancefloor"
"Move This Mountain"
Encore
"Get Over You"
"Take Me Home (A Girl Like Me)"

Tour dates

Notes

References

External links
 
 Review + Details
 
 Read My Lips Tour dates

2001 debut albums
Albums produced by Ben Hillier
Albums produced by Moby
Albums produced by Steve Osborne
Polydor Records albums
Sophie Ellis-Bextor albums
Electropop albums